Mamey is a barrio in the municipality of Guaynabo, Puerto Rico. Its population in 2010 was 3,103.

Sectors
Barrios (which are roughly comparable to minor civil divisions) in turn are further subdivided into smaller local populated place areas/units called sectores (sectors in English). The types of sectores may vary, from normally sector to urbanización to reparto to barriada to residencial, among others.

The following sectors are in Mamey barrio:

Sites
 is a scenic lookout located in Mamey that provides for views of the metropolitan area (San Juan).

See also

 List of communities in Puerto Rico
 List of barrios and sectors of Guaynabo, Puerto Rico

References

External links

Barrios of Guaynabo, Puerto Rico